Ace in the Hole, also known as The Big Carnival, is a 1951 American drama film directed by Billy Wilder. The film stars Kirk Douglas as a cynical, disgraced reporter who stops at nothing to try to regain a job on a major newspaper. The film co-stars Jan Sterling and features Robert Arthur and Porter Hall.

It marked a series of firsts for auteur Billy Wilder: it was the first time he was involved in a project as a writer, producer, and director; his first film following his breakup with long-time writing partner Charles Brackett, with whom he had collaborated on The Lost Weekend and Sunset Boulevard, among others; and his first film to be a critical and commercial failure.

The story is a biting examination of the seedy relationship between the press, the news it reports and the manner in which it reports it. The film also shows how a gullible public can be manipulated by the press. Without consulting Wilder, Paramount Pictures executive Y. Frank Freeman changed the title to The Big Carnival just prior to its release. Early television broadcasts retained that title, but when aired by Turner Classic Movies – and when released on DVD by The Criterion Collection in July 2007 – it reverted to Ace in the Hole.

In 2017, the film was selected for preservation in the United States National Film Registry by the Library of Congress as being "culturally, historically, or aesthetically significant".

The film is sometimes referred to as a film noir, but others say that although it shares some qualities with noir, it is not true film noir.

Plot
After being fired from eleven major newspapers due to his behavior and temper, Charles "Chuck" Tatum winds up in Albuquerque and offers himself to the publisher of the small Sun-Bulletin. Skeptical of Tatum, editor and publisher Jacob Boot hires Tatum for $60.

A year later, Tatum has grown bored with the slow pace of Albuquerque life. Boot sends Tatum and the newspaper's young photographer, Herbie Cook, to cover a rattlesnake hunt. When they stop for gas, the pair learn about Leo Minosa, a local man trapped in a collapsed cliff dwelling, and the two investigate. Tatum talks his way past the deputy sheriff and enters the cave with Cook. Despite falling rocks, Tatum ventures close enough to Leo to pass him some amenities. Tatum takes photographs of the trapped man, tries to cheer him up, and begins scheming his big story.

Leo's wife Lorraine is eager to leave Leo and their struggling gas station, but as tourists flock to the rescue site, the financial windfall leads her to go along with Tatum's scheme. After filing an initial report on the accident, Tatum persuades local sheriff Gus Kretzer to give him exclusive access to Leo in return for reportage that will guarantee Kretzer's reelection.

Kretzer and Tatum convince construction contractor Smollett to drill from above rather than shoring up the walls, extending the rescue from 12 hours to a week to keep the story going. As the days pass, the rescue site becomes an all-day carnival and Tatum starts drinking again. Cook loses his idealism and dreams of selling pictures to high-profile papers. Tatum quits the Sun-Bulletin, persuading Cook to quit with him, and Tatum talks Nagel, his former boss in New York, into hiring him to report exclusively from the scene for $1,000 a day plus his old job back.

Five days into the event, Leo develops pneumonia and is given 12 hours to live. Tatum sends a news flash: Leo will be rescued in 12 hours. However, Smollett tells him that shoring up the walls is now impossible due to the drilling. In a hypoxemic daze, Leo tells Tatum there is a fifth-year anniversary present for Lorraine in their bedroom. Tatum forces a reluctant Lorraine to open the gift, a fur stole, and Tatum makes her wear it. She protests, and Tatum begins to choke her with the stole. She stabs Tatum with the pair of scissors, and Tatum drives away.

Tatum takes the local priest to Leo to administer his last rites, and Leo dies. Tatum announces to the crowd that Leo died, proclaiming, "the circus is over." The other reporters send off the story to their newspapers ahead of Tatum. The carnival and crowd pack up to leave, and Lorraine is among them looking for a ride. Stumbling into his room and ridiculed by the other reporters, Cook tells Tatum that Nagel has fired him for letting other newspapers break the story of Leo's death. Tatum calls Nagel and tries to confess to killing Leo and purposely delaying the rescue, but Nagel hangs up on him without hearing his confession. Tatum and Cook drive back to the Sun-Bulletin offices, where Tatum tries to get back his position there. He collapses from his wound and dies.

Cast

 Kirk Douglas as Charles "Chuck" Tatum
 Jan Sterling as Lorraine Minosa
 Robert Arthur as Herbie Cook
 Porter Hall as Jacob Q. Boot, editor, publisher, and owner of the Albuquerque Sun-Bulletin
 Frank Cady as Al Federber, tourist and Pacific All-Risk insurance salesman
 Geraldine Hall as Nellie Federber
 Richard Benedict as Leo Minosa
 Ray Teal as Sheriff Gus Kretzer
 Lewis Martin as McCardle
 John Berkes as Papa Minosa
 Frances Dominguez as Mama Minosa
 Gene Evans as Deputy Sheriff
 Frank Jaquet as Sam Smollett
 Harry Harvey Sr. as Dr. Hilton
 Bob Bumpas as radio announcer
 Richard Gaines as Nagel, the New York newspaper editor
 Bert Moorhouse as Josh Morgan (uncredited)

Production

Development
The film's plot has similarities with two real-life events that ended in tragedy. The first involved W. Floyd Collins, who in 1925 was trapped inside Sand Cave, Kentucky, following a landslide. A Louisville newspaper, the Courier-Journal, jumped on the story by dispatching reporter William Burke Miller to the scene. Miller's enterprising coverage turned the tragic episode into a national event and earned the writer a Pulitzer Prize. Collins's name is cited in the film as an example of a cave-in victim who becomes a media sensation. The second event took place in April 1949. Three-year-old Kathy Fiscus of San Marino, California, fell into an abandoned well and, during a rescue operation that lasted several days, thousands of people arrived to watch the action unfold. In both cases, the victims died before they were rescued.

After the film's release, screenwriter Victor Desny sued Wilder for plagiarism because he had contacted Wilder's secretary Rosella Stewart to propose a film based on the story of Floyd Collins in November 1949. Wilder's attorneys responded that, not only did an oral plot summary not constitute a formal story submission, but the Collins case was historical in nature and as such was not protected by copyright laws. In December 1953, Judge Stanley Mosk ruled in favor of Wilder and Paramount. Desny appealed and in August 1956 the California Supreme Court ruled his oral submission had been legitimate. Wilder's attorneys settled that same month, paying Desny $14,350.

Writing
In the original script, Tatum colluded with the local sheriff. Joseph Breen of the Hays Code office strongly objected to the on-screen depiction of a corrupt law enforcement officer, and insisted Wilder add dialogue making it clear the man eventually would be made to answer for his actions.

Filming
The final cost of the film was $1,821,052, of which $250,000 was paid to Wilder as writer, producer and director. Its exterior set,, which was constructed 19 miles west of Gallup, was the largest non-combat set ever constructed at the time. Underground scenes were filmed in a mock-up at the Paramount Studios on Melrose Avenue in Hollywood. More than 1,000 extras and 400 cars were utilized in the crowd scenes. After the film was completed, Paramount charged admission to the set.

Frank Cady's character identifies himself as a salesman for Pacific All-Risk Insurance, a fictitious company featured in Wilder's 1944 film Double Indemnity.

Soundtrack
Jay Livingston and Ray Evans wrote the song "We're Coming, Leo," performed by a vocalist and band at the carnival.

Reception

Critical response
At the time of its release, critics found little to admire. In his review in The New York Times, Bosley Crowther called it "a masterly film" but added, "Mr. Wilder has let imagination so fully take command of his yarn that it presents not only a distortion of journalistic practice but something of a dramatic grotesque... [it] is badly weakened by a poorly constructed plot, which depends for its strength upon assumptions that are not only naïve but absurd. There isn't any denying that there are vicious newspaper men and that one might conceivably take advantage of a disaster for his own private gain. But to reckon that one could so tie up and maneuver a story of any size, while other reporters chew their fingers, is simply incredible."

The Hollywood Reporter called it "ruthless and cynical... a distorted study of corruption and mob psychology that... is nothing more than a brazen, uncalled-for slap in the face of two respected and frequently effective American institutions – democratic government and the free press." Variety was more positive, noting "the performances are fine. Douglas enacts the heel reporter ably, giving it color to balance its unsympathetic character. Jan Sterling also is good in a role that has no softening touches, and Benedict's victim portrayal is first-rate. Billy Wilder's direction captures the feel of morbid expectancy that always comes out in the curious that flock to scenes of tragedy."

The film has found new respect among critics. Roger Ebert of the Chicago Sun-Times wrote in 2007, "Although the film is 56 years old, I found while watching it again that it still has all its power. It hasn't aged because Wilder and his co-writers, Walter Newman and Lesser Samuels, were so lean and mean [with their dialogue]... [Kirk Douglas'] focus and energy... is almost scary. There is nothing dated about [his] performance. It's as right-now as a sharpened knife."

Dave Kehr in the Chicago Reader called it "cold, lurid, and fascinating" and Nathan Lee of The Village Voice wrote, "Here is, half a century out of the past, a movie so acidly au courant it stings."

Time Out London wrote, "As a diatribe against all that is worst in human nature, it has moments dipped in pure vitriol." TV Guide called it "a searing example of writer-director Billy Wilder at his most brilliantly misanthropic" and adds, "An uncompromising portrait of human nature at its worst, the film... stands as one of the great American films of the 1950s."

Ed Gonzalez of Slant wrote that the film "... allowed Wilder to question the very nature of human interest stories and the twisted relationship between the American media and its public. More than 50 years after the film's release, when magazines compete to come up with the cattiest buzz terms and giddily celebrate the demise of celebrity relationships for buffo bucks, Ace in the Hole feels more relevant than ever."

In his Slate review, Jack Shafer wrote in 2007: "If film noir illustrates the crackup of the American dream... Ace in the Hole is an exemplar of the form."

The film was included in film critic Roger Ebert's list of "The Great Movies" in 2001. In September 2008, Empire published its list of the Top 500 greatest movies of all time. With votes from 10,000 readers of the magazine along with 500 key film critics and 150 film industry figures, this film is ranked number 385. In 2015, the film ranked 100th on BBC's "100 Greatest American Films" list, voted on by film critics from around the world.

In 2022, Eddie Muller, founder and president of the Film Noir Foundation, in a Facebook "Noir or Not" segment stated that Ace in the Hole incorrectly gets labeled as a film noir because of director Wilder's other films Double Indemnity (1944) and Sunset Boulevard (1950), and because of the cynical storyline. Muller feels that Ace in the Hole is without many of the characteristics normally associated with film noir, and that it is more of a film about sleazy journalism.

Awards and nominations
Wins
 National Board of Review Award: Best Actress – Jan Sterling; 1951.
 Venice Film Festival: International Award for Best Director – Billy Wilder; 1951.
 Venice Film Festival: Best Music – Hugo Friedhofer; 1951.

Nomination
 Academy Award for Best Story and Screenplay – Billy Wilder, Lesser Samuels and Walter Newman; 1952.
 Venice Film Festival: Golden Lion – Billy Wilder; 1951.

Legacy 
The 1992 The Simpsons episode "Radio Bart" largely references the storyline of Ace in the Hole, featuring Bart Simpson lowering a portable radio into a well, and using a wireless microphone to broadcast his voice from it. He convinces the public that a boy named "Timmy O'Toole" had fallen into it, prompting news coverage and charity campaigns. Writer Jon Vitti noted that series creator Matt Groening "came in out of nowhere and just gave me, start to finish, the whole story."

See also
 Media circus

References
Notes

Bibliography

Further reading
  
Freely accessible essay by Richard Armstrong, who published a biography of Wilder in 2000.
 
Maddin is a filmmaker; publication of this essay accompanied the 2007 DVD release of Ace in the Hole by The Criterion Collection.

External links

 
 
 
 
 
 
Ace in the Hole: Noir in Broad Daylight an essay by Molly Haskell at the Criterion Collection

1951 films
1951 drama films
1950s satirical films
American drama films
American satirical films
1950s English-language films
American black-and-white films
Film noir
Films about journalists
American films based on actual events
Films directed by Billy Wilder
Films scored by Hugo Friedhofer
Films set in New Mexico
Films shot in New Mexico
Paramount Pictures films
Films involved in plagiarism controversies
Films with screenplays by Billy Wilder
Films with screenplays by Lesser Samuels
Films with screenplays by Walter Newman (screenwriter)
United States National Film Registry films
Criticism of journalism
1950s American films